Elisolimax flavescens is a species of air-breathing land snail or semislug, terrestrial pulmonate gastropod mollusks in the family Helicarionidae or Urocyclidae.

Identified in 1866 by naturalist Wilhelm Moritz Keferstein, this species occurs primarily in southeastern Africa.  It has not yet become established in the USA, but it is considered to represent a potentially serious threat as a pest, an invasive species which could negatively affect agriculture, natural ecosystems, human health or commerce. Therefore it has been suggested that this species be given top national quarantine significance in the USA.

References

Helicarionidae